In geometry, the tangent cone is a generalization of the notion of the tangent space to a manifold to the case of certain spaces with singularities.

Definitions in nonlinear analysis 
In nonlinear analysis, there are many definitions for a tangent cone, including the adjacent cone, Bouligand's contingent cone, and the Clarke tangent cone. These three cones coincide for a convex set, but they can differ on more general sets.

Clarke tangent cone 
Let  be a nonempty closed subset of the Banach space .

Clarke's tangent cone is always subset of the corresponding contingent cone (and coincides with it, when the set in question is convex). It has the important property of being a closed convex cone.

Definition in convex geometry 

Let K be a closed convex subset of a real vector space V and ∂K be the boundary of K. The solid tangent cone to K at a point x ∈ ∂K is the closure of the cone formed by all half-lines (or rays)  emanating from x and intersecting K in at least one point y distinct from x. It is a convex cone in V and can also be defined as the intersection of the closed half-spaces of V containing K and bounded by the supporting hyperplanes of K at x. The boundary TK of the solid tangent cone is the tangent cone to K and ∂K at x. If this is an affine subspace of V then the point x is called a smooth point of ∂K and ∂K is said to be differentiable at x and TK is the ordinary tangent space to ∂K at x.

Definition in algebraic geometry 

Let X be an affine algebraic variety embedded into the affine space , with defining ideal . For any polynomial f, let  be the homogeneous component of f of the lowest degree, the initial term of f, and let 

  

be the homogeneous ideal which is formed by the initial terms  for all , the initial ideal of I. The tangent cone to X at the origin is the Zariski closed subset of  defined by the ideal . The tangent cone serves as the extension of the notion of the tangent space to X at a regular point, where X most closely resembles a differentiable manifold, to all of X. (The tangent cone at a point of  that is not contained in X is empty.)

For example, the nodal curve

 

is singular at the origin, because both partial derivatives of f(x, y) = y2 − x3 − x2 vanish at (0, 0). Thus the Zariski tangent space to C at the origin is the whole plane, and has higher dimension than the curve itself (two versus one). On the other hand, the tangent cone is the union of the tangent lines to the two branches of C at the origin,

 

Its defining ideal is the principal ideal of k[x] generated by the initial term of f, namely y2 − x2 = 0.

The definition of the tangent cone can be extended to abstract algebraic varieties, and even to general Noetherian schemes. Let X be an algebraic variety, x a point of X, and (OX,x, m) be the local ring of X at x. Then the tangent cone to X at x is the spectrum of the associated graded ring of OX,x with respect to the m-adic filtration:

If we look at our previous example, then we can see that graded pieces contain the same information. So let

then if we expand out the associated graded ring

we can see that the polynomial defining our variety
 in

See also 
 Cone
 Monge cone
 Normal cone

References 

 

Convex geometry
Algebraic geometry
Variational analysis